Pietro Matteo d'Aquino (died 1511) was a Roman Catholic prelate who served as Bishop of Lecce (1508–1511) and Bishop of Gravina di Puglia (1482–1508).

Biography
In 1482, Pietro Matteo d'Aquino was appointed during the papacy of Pope Sixtus IV as Bishop of Gravina di Puglia.
On 18 February 1508, he was appointed during the papacy of Pope Julius II as Bishop of Lecce.
He served as Bishop of Lecce until his death in 1511.

References

External links and additional sources
 (for Chronology of Bishops) 
 (for Chronology of Bishops) 
 (for Chronology of Bishops) 
 (for Chronology of Bishops) 

15th-century Italian Roman Catholic bishops
16th-century Italian Roman Catholic bishops
Bishops appointed by Pope Sixtus IV
Bishops appointed by Pope Julius II
1511 deaths